The 2014–15 season was Tottenham Hotspur's 23rd in the Premier League and their 37th successive season in the top division of the English football league system.

The campaign represented Tottenham's 13th appearance in the UEFA Europa League, entering the Play-off round due to the result of the 2014 FA Cup Final, as a result of finishing sixth in the 2013–14 Premier League season.

Squad

First-team squad
Age listed below are accurate as of 24 May 2015.

Transfers

In

Total spending:  £27,700,000

Out

Total income:  £37,700,000+

Loan out

Overall transfer activity

Expenditure
Summer:  £22,700,000

Winter:  £5,000,000

Total:  £27,700,000

Income
Summer:  £32,700,000

Winter:  £5,000,000

Total:  £37,700,000

Net total
Summer:  £10,000,000

Winter:  £0

Total:  £10,000,000

Friendlies

First Team

Pre-season

Post-season

Competitions

Overview

Goalscorers

This includes all competitive matches. The list is sorted by squad number when total goals are equal.

Clean sheets
The list is sorted by squad number when total clean sheets are equal.

References

Tottenham Hotspur F.C. seasons
Tottenham Hotspur